Francesco Ingrassia (5 October  1922 – 28 April 2003) was an Italian actor, comedian and film director.

He was born in Palermo, Sicily, and began his career in the 1950s, although his career only really took off in the 1960s. He starred in many comedies, mainly appearing together with Franco Franchi as the comedy duo Franco and Ciccio. During the 1980s he also did television work. In the 1966 film Due Marines e un Generale (released internationally as War Italian Style), Franco and Ciccio worked with Buster Keaton.

The comedy duo Franco & Ciccio

In 1959, Franco Franchi finally settled a contract with his friend Ciccio Ingrassia to start a brilliant career in the theater. From 1961 until the end in 1992, the two friends will be the most famous comedy duo in Italy. In fact, the secret of their success is the creation of two Sicilian buffoons characters, charlatans and extremely messy, very similar to those of Totò and Peppino De Filippo, or Laurel and Hardy. Franco Franchi becomes the funny "Franco", a young man completely out of his mind which expresses itself only with the facial expressions and the movements of the rest of the body. Turns into Ciccio Ingrassia, the skeletal and mustachioed bully which believe him best of friend, but in reality he is much more stupid than him when the two characters have to resolve a difficult situation. Another feature of the commercial success and popular of the two characters is the use of the body as a means of communication and simple lines, sharp and not at all vulgar.

With these tricks up its sleeve, as both actors will be challenged in youth theater, Franco and Ciccio thanks to their friend Domenico Modugno began to pursue a film career as extras. Then they are noticed by directors of small comedy and so their film career begins.

In all years, the two actors churn out at least ten films, working at a pace unimaginable today. In fact, because these days very fast film products are among the best. And unfortunately the criticism then he cut down every film of Franco and Ciccio coming out to the movies, calling it useless and meaningless pecoreccio comedian. However, the popular success of films of Franco and Ciccio was huge and always has been until now in Italy and also in foreign countries.

The specialty of the many films of Franco and Ciccio is improvisation during the scenes, as did Toto and De Filippo, but also the use of parody. In fact there are many foreign films chosen by the two above you to pluck a fun comedy, as the saga of James Bond and that of the great adventure films.

Filmography (with Franco Franchi)

 Appuntamento a Ischia (1960, directed by Mario Mattoli) as The Tall Smuggler
 L'onorata società (1961, directed by Riccardo Pazzaglia) as Rosolino
 5 marines per 100 ragazze (1961, directed by Mario Mattoli) as Salvatore
 Il giudizio universale (1961, directed by Vittorio De Sica) as Unemployed man
 Maciste contro Ercole nella valle dei guai (1961, directed by Mario Mattoli) as Ingrassiade
 Gerarchi si muore (1961, directed by Giorgio Simonelli) as Cariddi
 Pugni pupe e marinai (1961, directed by Daniele D'Anza) as Rosario
 I tre nemici (1962, directed by Giorgio Simonelli) as Rocco
 I due della legione (1962, directed by Lucio Fulci) as Ciccio Fisichella
 2 samurai per 100 geishe (1962, directed by Giorgio Simonelli) as Ciccio Santuzzo
 Le massaggiatrici (1962, directed by Lucio Fulci) as Ciccio - Nightwatchman #2
 I motorizzati (1962, directed by Camillo Mastrocinque)
 Il mio amico Benito (1962, directed by Giorgio Bianchi) as Terrorista
 Avventura al motel (1963, directed by Renato Polselli) as Ciccio
 Il giorno più corto (1963, directed by Sergio Corbucci) as Francesco Coppola
 La donna degli altri è sempre più bella (1963, directed by Marino Girolami) as Calogero Merendino (segment "I Promessi Sposi")
 Obiettivo ragazze (1963, directed by Mario Mattoli) as Ciccio
 Tutto è musica (1963, directed by Domenico Modugno) as Anemia
 Gli imbroglioni (1963, directed by Lucio Fulci) as Napoleone (segment "Siciliani")
 Scandali nudi (1963, directed by Enzo Di Gianni) as Poliziotto Ciccio Smith
 Vino, whisky e acqua salata (1963, directed by Mario Amendola)
 I maniaci (1964, directed by Lucio Fulci) as Thief #2 (segment 'Il week-end)
 Queste pazze pazze donne (1964, directed by Marino Girolami) as Ciccio Pipitone ('Siciliani a Milano')
 I marziani hanno dodici mani (1964, directed by Franco Castellano & Pipolo) as Lo scrittore di fantascienza
 Due mafiosi nel Far West (1964, directed by Giorgio Simonelli) as Ciccio Capone / Il nonno di Ciccio / Ciccia la sedotta
 Le sette vipere (1964, directed by Renato Polselli) as Lawyer Ingrassia
 L'amore primitivo (1964, directed by Luigi Scattini) as Ciccio, Hotel Porter
 I due evasi di Sing Sing (1964, directed by Lucio Fulci) as Ciccio Bacalone
 Cadavere per signora (1964, directed by Mario Mattoli) as Luigi
 Amore facile (1964, directed by Gianni Puccini) as Ciccio (segment "Un uomo corretto")
 002 Agenti Segretissimi (1964, directed by Lucio Fulci) as Ciccio Passalacqua
 Sedotti e bidonati (1964, directed by Giorgio Bianchi) as Ciccio
 Un mostro e mezzo (1964, directed by Steno) as The Professor
 I due mafiosi (1964, directed by Giorgio Simonelli) as Ciccio Spampinato
 Le tardone (1964, directed by Marino Girolami) as The killer (episode "Un delitto quasi perfetto")
 I due toreri (1964, directed by Giorgio Simonelli) as Ciccio Scontentezza
 Canzoni, bulli e pupe (1964, directed by Carlo Infascelli)
 Due mattacchioni al Moulin Rouge (1964, directed by Giuseppe Vari) as Il falso poliziotto
 I due pericoli pubblici (1964, directed by Lucio Fulci) as Ciccio Introlia
 Io uccido, tu uccidi (1965, directed by Gianni Puccini) as Alfio (segment "Cavalleria Rusticana, oggi") / Ciccio (segment "Una boccata di fumo")
 Soldati e caporali (1965, directed by Mario Amendola) as Ciccio
 Letti sbagliati (1965, directed by Steno) as Se stesso (segment "La seconda moglie")
 Per un pugno nell'occhio (1965, directed by Michele Lupo) as Ciccio
 I figli del leopardo (1965, directed by Sergio Corbucci) as Ciccio / Baron Fifi
 Gli amanti latini (1965, directed by Mario Costa) as Ciccio (segment "Gli amanti latini")
 I due sergenti del generale Custer (1965, directed by Giorgio Simonelli) as Ciccio La Pera
 Come inguaiammo l'esercito (1965, directed by Lucio Fulci) as Sgt. Camilloni
 Due mafiosi contro Goldginger (1965, directed by Giorgio Simonelli) as Ciccio Pecora
 00-2 Operazione Luna (1965, directed by Lucio Fulci) as Ciccio Cacace / Major Borovin
 Due marines e un generale (1965, directed by Luigi Scattini) as Joe Acampora
 I due parà (1965, directed by Lucio Fulci) as Ciccio Impallomeni
 Veneri al sole (1965, directed by Marino Girolami) as Francesco Pattané (segment "Una domenica a Fregene")
 Due mafiosi contro Al Capone (1966, directed by Giorgio Simonelli) as Ciccio
 Come svaligiammo la Banca d'Italia (1966, directed by Lucio Fulci) as Ciccio
 Le spie vengono dal semifreddo (1966, directed by Mario Bava, [2]) as Ciccio
 I due figli di Ringo (1966, directed by Giorgio Simonelli e Giuliano Carnimeo) as Ciccio Magrì / Gringo
 Veneri in collegio, (1966, directed by Marino Girolami) as Ciccio Barbi
 I due sanculotti (1966, directed by Giorgio Simonelli) as Ciccio La Capra
 Come rubammo la bomba atomica (1967, directed by Lucio Fulci) as Ciccio
 Il lungo, il corto, il gatto (1967, directed by Lucio Fulci) as Ciccio
 Il bello, il brutto, il cretino (1967, directed by Giovanni Grimaldi) as Il cretino - Ciccio Ingrassy
 Due Rrringos nel Texas (1967, directed by Marino Girolami) as Sgt. Ciccio Stevens
 Stasera mi butto (1967, directed by Ettore Maria Fizzarotti) as Bath attendant
 I barbieri di Sicilia (1967, directed by Marcello Ciorciolini) as Ciccio Lo Persico
 Nel sole (1967, directed by Aldo Grimaldi) as Ciccio
 I Zanzaroni (1967, directed by Ugo La Rosa) (segment "Quelli qui restano")
 I due vigili (1967, directed by Giuseppe Orlandini)
 Gli altri, gli altri e noi (1967, directed by Maurizio Arena)
 Brutti di notte (1968, directed by Giovanni Grimaldi) as Ciccio - Rosaspina Brother
 L'oro del mondo (1968, directed by Aldo Grimaldi) as Ciccio - grocer
 Franco, Ciccio e le vedove allegre (1968, directed by Marino Girolami) as Ciccio Fulgenzi
 American Secret Service (1968, directed by Enzo Di Gianni)
 Capriccio all'italiana (1968, directed by Mauro Bolognini, Mario Monicelli, Pier Paolo Pasolini, Steno, Franco Rossi) as Roderigo (segment "Che cosa sono le nuvole?")
 Don Chisciotte and Sancio Panza (1968, directed by Giovanni Grimaldi) as Don Quixote
 Ciccio perdona... Io no! (1968, directed by Marcello Ciorciolini) as Ciccio
 I nipoti di Zorro (1968, directed by Marcello Ciorciolini) as Ciccio La Vacca
 I due crociati (1968, directed by Giuseppe Orlandini) as Ciccio Visconte di Braghelunge
 I due pompieri (1968, directed by Bruno Corbucci) as Ciccio Barrese
 I due deputati (1969, directed by Giovanni Grimaldi) as Dott. Francesco Grassiani
 Indovina chi viene a merenda? (1969, directed by Marcello Ciorciolini) as Ciccio La Rapa
 I due magnifici fresconi (un imbroglio tutto curve) (1969, directed by Marino Girolami) as Ciccio
 Franco, Ciccio e il pirata Barbanera (1969, directed by Mario Amendola) as Ciccio
 Franco e Ciccio... ladro e guardia (1969, directed by Marcello Ciorciolini) as Ciccio Chiappalone
 Lisa dagli occhi blu (1970, directed by Bruno Corbucci) as 'Centro Spaziale' Manager (uncredited)
 Satiricosissimo (1970, directed by Mariano Laurenti) as Ciccio
 Franco e Ciccio sul sentiero di guerra (1970, directed by Aldo Grimaldi) as Ciccio Spampinato
 Don Franco e Don Ciccio nell'anno della contestazione (1970, directed by Marino Girolami) as Don Ciccio
 Ma chi t'ha dato la patente? (1970, directed by Nando Cicero) as Cicco
 W le donne (1970, directed by Aldo Grimaldi) as Ciccio La Rosa
 I due maghi del pallone (1970, directed by Mariano Laurenti) as Ciccio Ingrassetti
 Principe coronato cercasi per ricca ereditiera (1970, directed by Giovanni Grimaldi) as Francesco
 Nel giorno del Signore (1970, directed by Bruno Corbucci) as Carceriere
 I due Maggiolini più matti del mondo (1970, directed by Giuseppe Orlandini) as Ciccio
 Due bianchi nell'Africa nera (1970, directed by Bruno Corbucci) as Ciccio Rapisarda
 Mazzabubù... Quante corna stanno quaggiù? (1971, directed by Mariano Laurenti) as Ciccio Merendino
 Ma che musica maestro (1971, directed by Mariano Laurenti) as Ciccio - Municipal policeman
 I due della Formula Uno alla corsa più pazza pazza del mondo (1971, directed by Osvaldo Civirani) as Ciccio
 Venga a fare il soldato da noi (1971, directed by Ettore Maria Fizzarotti) as Maresciallo La Rosa
 Riuscirà l'avvocato Franco Benenato a sconfiggere il suo acerrimo nemico il pretore Ciccio De Ingras? (1971, directed by Mino Guerrini) as Ciccio de Ingras
 Armiamoci e partite! (1971, directed by Nando Cicero) as Ciccio
 I due pezzi da 90 (1971, directed by Osvaldo Civirani)
 I due assi del guantone (1971, directed by Mariano Laurenti) as Ciccio Trapani
 Scusi, ma lei le paga le tasse? (1971, directed by Mino Guerrini) as Dott. Felice Cavaterra
 Il clan dei due Borsalini (1971, directed by Giuseppe Orlandini) as Prof. Francesco Ingrassini
 The Sicilian Checkmate (1972, directed by Florestano Vancini) as Ferdinando Giacalone
 Two Sons of Trinity (1972, directed by Osvaldo Civirani) as Ciccio Trinità
 I due gattoni a nove code... e mezza ad Amsterdam (1972, directed by Osvaldo Civirani) as Ciccio
 The Adventures of Pinocchio (1972, directed by Giuliano Cenci) as Volpe
 Storia di fifa e di coltello - Er seguito d' Er Più (1972, directed by Mario Amendola) as Ciccio Pennisi
 Continuavano a chiamarli i due piloti più matti del mondo (1972, directed by Mariano Laurenti) as Ciccio Ingrassetti
 Continuavano a chiamarli... er più e er meno (1972, directed by Giuseppe Orlandini) as Francesco Ribanera Mendoza d'Espinoza
 Amarcord (1973, directed by Federico Fellini) as Teo
 Farfallon (1974, directed by Riccardo Pazzaglia) as Barone di Vistacorta
 Paolo il freddo (1974, directed by Ciccio Ingrassia)
 Bianchi cavalli d'Agosto (1975, directed by Raimondo Del Balzo) as Fisherman
 Dracula in the Provinces (1975, directed by Lucio Fulci) as Salvatore, the Wizard of Noto
 L'Esorciccio (1975, directed by Ciccio Ingrassia) as L'Esorciccio
 Todo modo (1976, directed by Elio Petri) as Voltrano
 Traffic Jam (1979, directed by Luigi Comencini) as Ambulance sick man
 Crema, cioccolata e pa... prika (1981, directed by Michele Massimo Tarantini) as Ossobuco
 Kaos (1984, directed by Paolo & Vittorio Taviani, from the tales by Luigi Pirandello) as Don Lollò (segment "La giara")
 La Bohème (1988, directed by Luigi Comencini) as Parpignol
 It's Happening Tomorrow (1988, directed by Daniele Luchetti) as Gianloreto Bonacci
 Viaggio d'amore (1990, directed by Ottavio Fabbri) as The Priest
 Captain Fracassa's Journey (1990, directed by Ettore Scola) as Pietro, Sigognac's servant
 Condominio (1991, directed by Felice Farina) as Mar. Gaetano Scarfi
 La via del cibo (1994, directed by Eugenio Donadoni) as Il Grande Maestro
 Camerieri (1995, directed by Leone Pompucci) as Loppi
 Giovani e belli (1996, directed by Dino Risi) as Re degli Zingari
 Fatal Frames - Fotogrammi mortali (1996, directed by Al Festa) as Beggar (final film role)

External links
 
 Biography 

Film people from Palermo
20th-century Italian male actors
Italian comedians
Italian parodists
Comedy film directors
Italian film directors
Parody film directors
1922 births
2003 deaths
David di Donatello winners
Nastro d'Argento winners
Italian male film actors
20th-century Italian comedians
Male actors from Palermo